Gregory Alan Lewis (born August 10, 1969) is an American former professional football player who was a running back for the Denver Broncos of the National Football League (NFL) for two seasons in the 1990s. He played college football with the Washington Huskies and received All-American honors and the Pacific-10 Conference offensive player of the year award in 1990.  Lewis was the inaugural winner of the Doak Walker Award given to the most outstanding running back in college football.

See also
 Washington Huskies football statistical leaders

References

External links
 NFL.com player page

1969 births
Living people
All-American college football players
American football running backs
Denver Broncos players
People from Port St. Joe, Florida
Washington Huskies football players